Dadri railway station is a small railway station serving the city of Dadri in Gautam Buddh Nagar district, Uttar Pradesh, India, on the Delhi–Aligarh–Kanpur main line, on the outskirts of Ghaziabad and 50 kilometers east of Delhi. Its station code in Indian Railways terminology is DER. Dadri is a wayside station at which only a few commuter trains stop. The station consists of four platforms which are not well sheltered and lack most facilities including sanitation. Electronic interlocking and massive yard remodelling has been commissioned at Dadri station. Dadri is a complex yard in North Central Railway spread over six kilometres on busiest route of Delhi–Howrah section and also having connectivity with NTPC Dadri Power Plant and Container Depot.

Trains 
Trains that halt at Dadri:
 Hathras Killah–Delhi–Hathras Killah MEMU
 Delhi–Aligarh–Delhi MEMU
 Tundla–Delhi–Tundla MEMU
 Lichchavi Express

Dedicated Freight Corridor (DFC) 
Dadri railway station on the Western Dedicated Freight Corridor (Western DFC) will be connected with Khurja railway station on Eastern Dedicated Freight Corridor (Eastern DFC) via a 46 km long branch line, for movement of Freight trains only. Both DFCs are under-construction.

Gallery

References

Railway stations in Gautam Buddh Nagar district
Allahabad railway division
Dadri